Nahargarh Fort stands on the edge of the Aravalli Hills, overlooking the city of Jaipur in the Indian state of Rajasthan. Along with Amer Fort and Jaigarh Fort, Nahargarh once formed a strong defence ring for the city. The fort was originally named Sudershangarh, but it became known as Nahargarh, which means 'abode of tigers'. The popular belief is that Nahar here stands for Nahar Singh Bhomia, whose spirit haunted the place and obstructed construction of the fort. Nahar's spirit was pacified by building a temple in his memory within the fort, which thus became known by his name.

History 

Built mainly in 1734 by Maharaja Sawai Jai Singh, the king of Jaipur, the fort was constructed as a place of retreat on the summit of the ridge above the city. Walls extended over the surrounding hills, forming fortifications that connected this fort to Jaigarh, the fort above the old capital of Amber. Though the fort never came under attack during the course of its history, it did see some historical events, notably, the treaties with the Maratha forces who warred with Jaipur in the 18th century. During the Indian Mutiny of 1857, the Europeans of the region, including the British Resident's wife, were moved to Nahargarh fort by the king of Jaipur, Sawai Ram Singh, for their protection.

The fort was extended in 1868, during the reign of Sawai Ram Singh. In 1883-92, a range of palaces was built at Nahargarh by Dirgh Patel at a cost of nearly three and a half lakh rupees. The Madhavendra Bhawan, built by Sawai Madho Singh had suites for the queens of Jaipur and at the head was a suite for the king himself. The rooms are linked by corridors and still have some delicate frescoes. Nahargarh was also a hunting residence of the Maharajas.

Until April 1944, the Jaipur State government used for its official purposes solar time read from the Samrat Yantra in the Jantar Mantar Observatory, with a gun fired from Nahargarh Fort as the time signal.

Some scenes in the movies Rang De Basanti, Shuddh Desi Romance and Sonar Kella were shot at Nahargarh Fort.

Visitation 
The ticket for the historical fort of Nahargarh costs 50 for Indian nationals. Students enjoy discounted prices. For foreign students, the ticket costs , and 25 for Indian students.

Nahargarh fort is open from 10:00 and the gates of the fort closes in the evening at 17.30 The visitors are not advised to stay any later than that because the fort is surrounded by dense deciduous forest. The forest is part of Nahargarh Biological Park and home to many wild animals.

Nearby attractions 

 Kanak Vrindavan
 Jantar Mantar
 Jaigarh Fort
 Amer Fort
 City Palace
 Hawa Mahal 
 Jal Mahal

See also 
 Nahargarh Biological Park

References

External links

Nahargarh Fort Complete Guide

Forts in Rajasthan
Tourist attractions in Jaipur
Rajput architecture